Hear You Me! A Tribute To Mykel And Carli is a compilation album released in 1998 on Vast Records.

When Mykel and Carli Allan died, a tribute and benefit concert was organized to help the Allan family with the funeral costs. The show featured bands that were friends of the Allan sisters (that dog. and Black Market Flowers amongst others), and was headlined by Weezer. The concert took place at the Palace Theater in Hollywood on August 15, 1997.

The show, in turn, inspired the album, which was conceived as both a further tribute and benefit for the Allan family. The album contained mostly rare or unreleased tracks by bands that were friends or acquaintances of the sisters, or who simply wanted to help out.

Track listing

References

External links
Vast Records "Hear You Me" page
Vast Records pictorial tribute
Vast Records official site

1998 compilation albums
Tribute albums to non-musicians